Several municipalities in the Canadian province of Quebec held municipal elections on November 4, 1990. Results for these elections may be found on this page. The most closely watched contest was in Montreal, where Jean Doré was elected to a second term without difficulty.

Results

Cowansville

Source: Rita Legault, "Sherbrooke voters turf out their mayor," Montreal Gazette, 5 November 1990, A5.

Montreal

Source: Election results, 1833-2005 (in French), City of Montreal.

Montreal North

References

 
1990